The Texas Open is an annual women's pro squash tournament that takes place alternately in Dallas and Houston, United States in the first half of the year. It is an official PSA World Tour event.

History of the Texas Open 
The Texas Open with women's pro Tour event as we know it today has an unusual heritage. The “parents” are an odd but surprisingly compatible couple: Houston Squash and Dallas Squash.

The squash association in  has a distinguished amateur tournament history, including several Texas Opens during the 1990s. In 1996 the organizers added a men's Open draw with prize money. It was not a men's professional tour event, but as the prize grew, the number and quality of pro players accepting an invitation to participate increased. The 1998 version, hosted by the Met Club and the Houston YMCA, was particularly successful. As Rishad Alikhan reported “From the Courts” following the Oct. 23-25 event in : “This year’s event offered $8500 in prize money in the Open draw and saw the largest number of participants in the tournament’s history with 112 players participating in 127 slots in 10 draws.”  The Open final was a 3-1 upset victory for English pro Nick Taylor (at the time ranked 35 in the world) over 1997 World Champion, Australian Rodney Eyles, (ranked 4 at the time). Several  players participated and a few even featured in the amateur draw honors: Jamie Bush 3.5 winner, Mike Frederick 3.5 Consolation winner, Ken Stillman 50+ Consolation winner, Susan Morrison Women's C/D winner. For a number of reasons, 4 years passed before the next staging of a comparable Texas Open in, and by then an interesting change had occurred.

In May 2000, Dallas hosted a $17,000 WISPA Tour event. But that spark actually first caught fire in Dallas rather than Houston for two reasons. Everyone in the large audience was impressed by her style and athleticism as she beat him. In addition,  already had a top woman teaching pro in Thelma Van Eck. Having suffered on court with her, local players understood only too well how tough Thelma could be and were now curious how she might fare against the world's best. The stage was set for the WISPA Dallas Open! On the international court at the Downtown Dallas YMCA, one of only five proper 21’ courts in the whole Metroplex at the time, World #1 Cassie Jackman (playing under her married name, Campion) beat World #2 Leilani Joyce for the crown in four games. Local heroine Van Eck had failed to halt Joyce's march in the first round but had played valiantly. She had qualified for the main draw with a victory over rising star Natalie Grinham, ranked 30th in the world at the time. Their most recent installment of the Texas Open had been two years earlier and it would be two more years until the next one, but a new seed was sown.

A record number of amateurs played and partied while enjoying professional squash competition in the form of a $36,000 WISPA Gold tour event. World #3 Carol Owens from  beat World #4 Cassie Jackman to take the first WISPA Texas Open title in five games.

The squash associations of Houston and Dallas rely heavily on the time and energy of keen but busy volunteers. Putting on a major professional event requires extraordinary fundraising and organizing effort for squash communities of our size. After the hugely enjoyable but exhausting events in 2000 and 2002, both cities discovered that sharing the burden might make sense. Having a year to recover and regroup while just enjoying the other city's instalment of the event makes the whole effort more sustainable. Jackman was sidelined with a back injury, but Carol Owens returned to beat Natalie Grainger in the final and repeat as champion. Custody of the Texas Open has continued to be jointly held by Houston and Dallas ever since, right up to this year's eighth consecutive annual installment in. The series' permanent trophy cup was contributed by starting with the 2005 event and now even features in the WSF's Squash 2016 promotional video.

Past Results

Women's

Tournament Directors 
2000, 2003, 2005 - Susan Morrison

2002, 2004, 2006 - Rishad Alikhan

2008, 2010 - Ian Munro

2012, 2014 - John Levy

2007, 2009, 2011, 2013, 2015, 2017, 2019 - Sanjeeb Samanta

See also
PSA World Tour
WSA World Tour

References

Squash in Texas
Squash tournaments in the United States